Nairobi City County is one of the 47 counties of Kenya. With a population of 4,397,073 in the 2019 census, it is the third smallest yet the most populous of the counties, also serving as the capital of Kenya. In 2013, the county entity was effected, replacing Nairobi City Council, the long-standing unit of administration since pre-independence. The city county consists of eleven gazetted sub-counties and eighty five electoral wards. On the national level, Nairobi also sends seventeen Members of Parliament across the constituencies and one County Woman Representative to the National Assembly; one senator to the Senate. The county government, which is allocated devolved functions as per the constitution, is headed by the county governor, who appoints his cabinet. The county's legislature is headed by the County Speaker, who presides over the County Assembly: single-member elected Members of the County Assembly (MCAs) represent their respective electoral wards. Additional MCAs are also nominated by political parties as a form of affirmative action.

Nairobi City County shares the same boundaries as the then Nairobi Province; Kenya's eight provinces were sub-divided into forty seven Counties of Kenya as per the Constitution of Kenya, based on the forty seven districts that were established prior to 1992.

On 25 August 2022 after the general elections in Kenya, Johnson Sakaja was sworn-in as the fourth Governor of Nairobi County.

Demographics
Based on the population census conducted by Kenya National Bureau of Statistics in 2019, determined the resident population of Nairobi City County was 4,397,073 within the city proper, the highest of the counties. A breakdown of the population showed that there were 2,192,452 males, 2,204,376 females and 245 intersex individuals. Embakasi Sub-county had the highest population of 988,808, accounting for more than 22% of the total population of the county; Kasarani came in second with 780,656. The population density was highest in the sub-county of Mathare with 68,942/km2 followed by a distant second by Kamukunji with 25,455/km2, then Makadara with 16150/km2, Kibra and Dagoretti with 15,311/km2, and 14,908/km2 respectively. Lang'ata had the lowest population density with 911/km2, with the highest household size of 3.1.

Administrative and electoral boundaries
Nairobi is divided into 17 electoral constituencies, 85 wards, and 11 sub-counties.

Leadership

See also
Gatharaini
Gathanga
Kamulu
Nairobi City
Mombasa County

References

Notes

External links 
 Nairobi City
 OpenDataKenya
 CIA World Factbook
 Kenya Wards

Nairobi
Counties of Kenya